The Journal of Accounting, Auditing & Finance is a quarterly peer-reviewed academic journal that covers the field of accounting. Its editor-in-chief is Bala K. R. Balachandran (New York University). It was established in 1986 and is currently published by SAGE Publications.

Abstracting and indexing 

The Journal of Accounting, Auditing & Finance is abstracted and indexed in:
 ABI/INFORM
 Business Source Complete
 Business Source Premier

External links 
 

SAGE Publishing academic journals
English-language journals
Accounting journals
Quarterly journals
Publications established in 1986